Jantantrik Bahujan Samaj Party (Democratic Majority Society Party), splinter group of Bahujan Samaj Party (BSP) formed in 1997 when 19 BSP Members of the Legislative Assembly of Uttar Pradesh broke away. JBSP allied themselves with Bharatiya Janata Party (BJP) and joined the National Democratic Alliance. In UP they gave their support to Kalyan Singh's government. 17 out of the JBSP MLAs were inducted as ministers in the state government. The president of JBSP was DP Yadav (Rajya Sabha MP) and the general secretary Shahidullah Khan.

JBSP became an unstable party and suffered various splits. Four MLAs defected to Lok Jan Shakti Party. Another splinter group was Kisan Mazdoor Bahujan Party.

When JBSP fell apart DP Yadav organized a new party, Rashtriya Parivartan Dal.

JBSP should not be confused with another BSP splinter group, Loktantrik Bahujan Samaj Party.

References

Defunct political parties in Uttar Pradesh
Political schisms
 
Political parties established in 1997
1997 establishments in Uttar Pradesh
Ambedkarite political parties
Dalit politics